Stigmacros is an Australian genus of small ants in the subfamily Formicinae. The genus is endemic to Australia. They are generalist predators that forage in the leaf litter, on the ground or in trees.

Species

Stigmacros aciculata McAreavey, 1957
Stigmacros acuta McAreavey, 1957
Stigmacros aemula (Forel, 1907)
Stigmacros anthracina McAreavey, 1957
Stigmacros armstrongi McAreavey, 1957
Stigmacros australis (Forel, 1902)
Stigmacros barretti Santschi, 1928
Stigmacros bosii (Forel, 1902)
Stigmacros brachytera McAreavey, 1957
Stigmacros brevispina McAreavey, 1957
Stigmacros brooksi McAreavey, 1957
Stigmacros castanea McAreavey, 1957
Stigmacros clarki McAreavey, 1957
Stigmacros clivispina (Forel, 1902)
Stigmacros debilis Bolton, 1995
Stigmacros elegans McAreavey, 1949
Stigmacros epinotalis McAreavey, 1957
Stigmacros extreminigra McAreavey, 1957
Stigmacros ferruginea McAreavey, 1957
Stigmacros flava McAreavey, 1957
Stigmacros flavinodis Clark, 1938
Stigmacros foreli (Viehmeyer, 1925)
Stigmacros fossulata (Viehmeyer, 1925)
Stigmacros froggatti (Forel, 1902)
Stigmacros glauerti McAreavey, 1957
Stigmacros hirsuta McAreavey, 1957
Stigmacros impressa McAreavey, 1957
Stigmacros inermis McAreavey, 1957
Stigmacros intacta (Viehmeyer, 1925)
Stigmacros lanaris McAreavey, 1957
Stigmacros major McAreavey, 1957
Stigmacros marginata McAreavey, 1957
Stigmacros medioreticulata (Viehmeyer, 1925)
Stigmacros minor McAreavey, 1957
Stigmacros nitida McAreavey, 1957
Stigmacros occidentalis (Crawley, 1922)
Stigmacros pilosella (Viehmeyer, 1925)
Stigmacros proxima McAreavey, 1957
Stigmacros punctatissima McAreavey, 1957
Stigmacros pusilla McAreavey, 1957
Stigmacros rectangularis McAreavey, 1957
Stigmacros reticulata Clark, 1930
Stigmacros rufa McAreavey, 1957
Stigmacros sordida McAreavey, 1957
Stigmacros spinosa McAreavey, 1957
Stigmacros stanleyi McAreavey, 1957
Stigmacros striata McAreavey, 1957
Stigmacros termitoxena Wheeler, 1936
Stigmacros wilsoni McAreavey, 1957

References

External links

Formicinae
Ant genera
Hymenoptera of Australia